John Mason Parker (August 19, 1882 – 1960) was a farmer and political figure in Saskatchewan, Canada. He represented Touchwood from 1917 to 1938 in the Legislative Assembly of Saskatchewan as a Liberal. Parker was speaker for the Saskatchewan assembly from 1934 to 1938.

He was the son of William Parker and Sarah Taylor and was educated in Watford, Ontario. In 1903, he married Mary Elizabeth Saunders. Parker served on the council for the rural municipality of Kellross, also serving as reeve. Parker lived in Kelliher. He served as clerk for the Saskatchewan assembly from 1939 to 1949.

References 

Saskatchewan Liberal Party MLAs
Speakers of the Legislative Assembly of Saskatchewan
1882 births
1960 deaths